Lomographa glomeraria, the gray spring moth, is a moth of the family Geometridae. The species was first described by Augustus Radcliffe Grote in 1881. It is found in eastern North America, including Alabama, Arkansas, Illinois, Indiana, Maryland, Massachusetts, Michigan, Oklahoma, Ontario, Pennsylvania and Tennessee.

The wingspan is about 25 mm. Adults have finely mottled gray wings with scalloped lines. The lines are darker on the forewings than on the hindwings. The discal spots are very prominent. There is considerable geographic variation. Adults rest with their wings outstretched or overlapping.

The larvae feed on Prunus species.

References

External links

Moths described in 1881
Lomographa
Moths of North America